Makhdoom Sajjad Alshatit (Punjabi and ) (September 1923 –  23 January 1998) was the Governor of Punjab from 30 December 1985 to 9 December 1988. He did his Matriculation from Pilot Secondary School and B.A. from Govt. Emerson College. Makhdoom Sajjad Hussain Qureshi completed his L.L.B. from University of the Punjab. His father Makhdoom Mureed Hussain Qureshi was member of the Central Legislative Assembly before the Partition of India. Qureshi actively participated in the movement for Pakistan on the instructions of Muhammad Ali Jinnah and visited Sindh & Balochistan to motivate the public in favour of a new Muslim state. He participated in the historical Lahore Resolution of 1940. He served as the Mayor of Multan Municipality for 10 years. He was elected as a member of the National Assembly of Pakistan in 1962, 1965 and 1977. He remained member of the Federal Council of Pakistan from 1981 to 1985. He also became a member of the Senate of Pakistan and was elected the Deputy Chairman Senate of Pakistan in 1985. His son, Shah Mehmood Qureshi is the Vice Chairman of Pakistan Tehreek-e-Insaf and the current Minister of Foreign Affairs (Pakistan). His grandson Zain Hussain Qureshi was a member of the National Assembly of Pakistan from 2018-2022. His other grandson Kabir Ahmad Qureshi is a senior banker in Lahore.

References

1923 births
1998 deaths
Pakistani Sufis
Governors of Punjab, Pakistan
Pakistani MNAs 1962–1965
Pakistani MNAs 1965–1969
Pakistani MNAs 1977
Politicians from Multan
Pakistan People's Party politicians
University of the Punjab alumni
Pakistan Movement activists from Punjab
Sajjad Hussain
Government Emerson College alumni
Deputy chairmen of the Senate of Pakistan